is an official Japanese recognition and honor which is awarded annually to select people who have made outstanding cultural contributions. This distinction is intended to play a role as a part of a system of support measures for the promotion of creative activities in Japan.  By 1999, 576 people had been selected as Persons of Cultural Merit.

System of recognition
The Order of Culture and Persons of Cultural Merit function in tandem to honor those who have contributed to the advancement and development of Japanese culture in a variety of fields, including academia, arts, science and sports.

Persons of Cultural Merit

The 1951 Law on Pensions for the Persons of Cultural Merit honors persons of cultural merit by providing a special government-sponsored pension. Since 1955, the new honorees have been announced on the same day as the award ceremony for the Order of Culture.

Order of Culture

The award ceremony, which takes place at the Imperial Palace on the Day of Culture (November 3). Candidates for the Order of Culture are selected from the Persons of Cultural Merit by the Minister of Education, Culture, Sports, Science and Technology, who then recommends the candidates to the Prime Minister. The final decisions are made by the Cabinet.

Selected recipients

 Makoto Asashima, developmental biologist
 Seiji Ozawa, conductor
 Hisao Domoto, abstract painter
 Toru Funamura, composer
 Toshi Ichiyanagi, composer
 Akira Isogai, bio-organic chemistry researcher
 Tota Kaneko, haiku poet
 Asami Maki, choreographer
 Kyoko Matsuoka, author and translator
 Makoto Nagao, information engineering
 Tomijuro Nakamura, Kabuki actor
 Tatsuo Nishida, linguist
 Man Nomura, Kyogen actor
 Sayume Okuda, craftswoman
 Hiroyuki Sakaki, electronic engineer
 Koichi Shimoda, physicist
 Kiichi Sumikawa, sculptor
 Kenichi Tominaga, economic sociologist
 Naoya Shiga (1951), author
 Hideki Yukawa (1951), physicist
 Masuji Ibuse (1966), author (for the work Black Rain).
 Haruko Sugimura (1974), actress
 Motoo Ōtaguro (1977), music critic
 Susumu Tonegawa (1983), medical researcher
 Hisaya Morishige (1984), actor
Fuku Akino (1991), Nihonga painter
 Ryotaro Shiba (1991), writer
 Isuzu Yamada (1993), actress
Migishi Setsuko (1994), painter
 Jakucho Setouchi (1997), Buddhist nun and author
 Mitsuko Mori (1998), actress
 Koji Nakanishi (1999), chemist
 Marius Berthus Jansen (1999), historian
 Ito Masami (2000), judge
 Ishimura Uzaemon XVII (2000), Kabuki actor
 Shotaro Yasuoka (2001), writer
 Donald Keene (2002), educator
 Shozo Shimada (2004), artist
 Ken Takakura (2006), actor
 Tatsuya Nakadai (2007), actor
 Makoto Asashima (2008), biologist
 Nakamura Tomijyuro V (2008), Kabuki actor
Taiho Koki (2009), sumo wrestler
 Yoshihide Kozai (2009), astronomer
 Sayuri Yoshinaga (2010), actress
 Hideji Ōtaki (2011), actor
 Matsumoto Kōshirō IX (2012), Kabuki actor
 Hayao Miyazaki (2012), film director, animator, manga artist, producer, and screenwriter 
 Shun'ichi Amari (2012), mathematician
 Hiroko Takenishi (2012), author
 Mitsumasa Anno (2012), artist, children's author
 Nobutaka Hirokawa (2013), neuroscientist and cell biologist
 Tamio Yamakawa (2014), biochemist
 Tsuneko Okazaki (2015), molecular biologist
Tsumura Setsuko (2016), novelist
 Nakamura Kichiemon II (2017), Kabuki actor
 Mutsuo Takahashi (2017), poet
 Hisashi Yamamoto (2018), chemist
 Moto Hagio (2019), manga artist
 Shigeru Miyamoto (2019), video game developer
 Koichi Sugiyama (2020), composer
Yoshiyuki Tomino (2021), Mecha anime creator, animator, songwriter, director, screenwriter, novelist

See also
 Cross of Honour for Science and Art, First Class (Austria)
 Italian Medal of Merit for Culture and Art
 Living National Treasure (Japan)
 Order of Arts and Letters of Spain
 Order of Honour (Russia) 
 Order of the Companions of Honour (UK)
 Ordre des Arts et des Lettres (France)
 Pour le Mérite (Germany; recognised by the state, though not a state order)

Notes

References
 Peterson, James W., Barry C. Weaver and Michael A. Quigley. (2001). Orders and Medals of Japan and Associated States. San Ramon, California: Orders and Medals Society of America.

External links
 Japan, Cabinet Office: Decorations and Medals in Japan
 Decoration Bureau: Order of Culture
 Japan Mint: Production Process

Awards established in 1951
Orders, decorations, and medals of Japan
Japanese awards
1951 establishments in Japan